Shershon is a settlement on the north side of the Lower Barun Glacier in Nepal.

Populated places in Nepal